The  Edward A. Rath County Office Building  is a high-rise office building located at 95 Franklin Street, in Buffalo, New York across from Erie County Hall and the Prudential (Guaranty) Building. The Rath building was named for Edward A. Rath, the first County Executive of Erie County, New York. The building contains the Erie County Executive’s office, Department of Motor Vehicles, Department of Public Works, the Office of Geographic Information Services, and a number of other county departments. It was designed by architectural firms Milstein, Wittek, Davis & Hamilton and Backus, Crane & Love, and constructed c. 1968.

History
Several notable buildings existed on the current site prior to the Rath building including the:
D. S. Morgan Building (1895-1965)

See also
 List of tallest buildings in Buffalo

Gallery

References

External links
 
 

Skyscraper office buildings in Buffalo, New York
Government buildings in New York (state)
Office buildings completed in 1969